Palari is a small village of Seoni district of Madhya Pradesh, India. The village is locally famous for its fertile land, and for its mandi, where farmers sell wheat and soybean.

Location
The village is located beside the Sagar river. Village comes under Keolari tehsil and Seoni District .

Transportation
Bus and railway are the common means of transport here. The area once had a local railway station.

Education
The village has a higher secondary school, which is run by government of Madhya Pradesh

References 

Villages in Seoni district